The 2018 Brazilian Grand Prix (formally known as the Formula 1 Grande Prêmio Heineken do Brasil 2018) was a Formula One motor race held on 11 November 2018 at the Autódromo José Carlos Pace in São Paulo, Brazil. Following Felipe Massa's retirement from Formula One at the end of the  season, this marked the first Brazilian Grand Prix where no Brazilian driver took part. 

The race was won by Lewis Hamilton from pole position. Hamilton's race win combined with teammate Valtteri Bottas finishing 5th meant that Mercedes were able to claim the Constructors' Championship for the 5th consecutive season.

Background
Going into the penultimate round of the  season Lewis Hamilton had already claimed the Drivers' Championship, however Ferrari and Mercedes could both still claim the Constructors' Championship. Ferrari needed to outscore Mercedes by 13 points or more to prevent Mercedes winning the title after the race's completion.

Qualifying

Qualifying classification

Notes
  – Daniel Ricciardo received a five-place grid penalty for a change in turbochargers.
  – Esteban Ocon received a five-place grid penalty for an unscheduled gearbox change.

Race 
Max Verstappen was leading and extending his lead over Lewis Hamilton in second until, on lap 44, Verstappen made contact with Esteban Ocon, who was trying to unlap himself, causing both drivers to spin allowing Hamilton to take the lead and eventually the win. Following the collision, the stewards gave Ocon a ten-second stop-go penalty for the incident. With the win by its driver Lewis Hamilton, Mercedes wrapped up the Constructors' Championship, while Max Verstappen's Red Bull finished second and Kimi Räikkönen's Ferrari finished third. Daniel Ricciardo took fourth ahead of Bottas with Vettel struggling home to sixth. Ocon finished 13th.

After the race Max Verstappen pushed and hit Ocon forcefully several times in the chest in the FIA's garage. Verstappen would later be punished for actions that were deemed inappropriate for a sportsman and was punished with two days community service.

Race classification

Notes
  – Stoffel Vandoorne and Fernando Alonso each received a five-second time penalty for ignoring blue flags.

Championship standings after the race 

Drivers' Championship standings

Constructors' Championship standings

 Note: Only the top five positions are included for both sets of standings.
 Bold text indicates the 2018 World Champions.

References

External links

2018 Formula One races
2018 Brazilian Grand Prix
2018 in Brazilian motorsport
Brazilian Grand Prix